Panagiotis Xanthakos (born 22 June 1948) is a Greek former sports shooter. He competed in four Olympic Games.

References

1948 births
Living people
Greek male sport shooters
Olympic shooters of Greece
Shooters at the 1968 Summer Olympics
Shooters at the 1972 Summer Olympics
Shooters at the 1976 Summer Olympics
Shooters at the 1984 Summer Olympics
Sportspeople from Athens
20th-century Greek people